A shares, also known as domestic shares are shares that are denominated in Renminbi and traded in the Shanghai and Shenzhen stock exchanges, as well as the National Equities Exchange and Quotations.

These are in contrast to B shares that are denominated in foreign currency and traded in Shanghai and Shenzhen, as well as H shares, that are denominated in Hong Kong dollars and traded in the Stock Exchange of Hong Kong.

See also
Chip
 Red chip
 P chip
 S chip
 N share
 L share
 G share
 China Concepts Stock

References

Finance in China
Stock market terminology

de:Aktienart (China)#A-Aktie .28A-Share.29